Emily Writes is the pen-name of a New Zealand parenting writer based in Wellington. She has published two books on parenting, one of which has been adapted as a play.

Biography
Writes published her first piece of writing on her blog in March 2015; she wrote about the difficulties of settling her newborn baby to sleep at 3 a.m. The post was immediately successful and she began to write more pieces about the struggles of parenting. In 2017 she published her first book, Rants in the Dark, which was adapted as a play and has toured New Zealand. The following year, she published her second book, Is It Bedtime Yet?

In February 2016 Writes and Holly Walker started a parenting podcast called Dear Mamas.

Writes has written parenting columns for Metro magazine, The New Zealand Herald and the New Zealand Woman’s Weekly, and she is editor of The Spinoff Parents.

References

21st-century New Zealand writers
21st-century New Zealand women writers
New Zealand bloggers
People from Wellington City
Living people
Year of birth missing (living people)
21st-century pseudonymous writers
New Zealand women bloggers